The 2nd New York State Legislature, consisting of the New York State Senate and the New York State Assembly, met from October 13, 1778, to March 17, 1779, during the second year of George Clinton's governorship, at Poughkeepsie.

Background
Under the provisions of the New York Constitution of 1777, the State Senators were elected on general tickets in the senatorial districts, and were then divided into four classes. Six senators each drew lots for a term of 1, 2, 3 or 4 years and, beginning at the election in April 1778, every year six Senate seats came up for election to a four-year term. Assemblymen were elected countywide on general tickets to a one-year term, the whole assembly being renewed annually.

On May 8, 1777, the Constitutional Convention had appointed the senators from the Southern District, and the assemblymen from Kings, New York, Queens, Richmond and Suffolk counties—the area which was under British control—and determined that these appointees serve in the Legislature until elections could be held in those areas, presumably after the end of the American Revolutionary War. Vacancies among the appointed members in the Senate should be filled by the Assembly, and vacancies in the Assembly by the Senate.

Elections
The State elections were held from April 28 to 30, 1778. Under the determination by the Constitutional Convention, the senators Isaac Roosevelt and John Morin Scott, whose seats were up for election, continued in office, as well as the assemblymen from Kings, New York, Queens, Richmond and Suffolk counties. Two vacancies in the Senate—caused by the death of Philip Livingston and the election of Pierre Van Cortlandt as Lieutenant Governor—were filled by the State Assembly. Henry Wisner (Middle D.) and Abraham Yates Jr. (Western D.) were re-elected. Assemblymen Ebenezer Russell (Eastern D.) and Jacob G. Klock (Western D.) were elected to the Senate.

The State Legislature met in Poughkeepsie, the seat of Dutchess County, on October 13, 1778, and adjourned on November 6. The Senate reconvened from January 27 to March 17, the Assembly from January 28 to March 16, 1779. Due to the difficult situation during the American Revolutionary War, four senators and several assemblymen could not attend the meeting.

State Senate

Districts
The Southern District (9 seats) consisted of Kings, New York, Queens, Richmond, Suffolk and Westchester counties.
The Middle District (6 seats) consisted of Dutchess, Orange and Ulster counties.
The Eastern District (3 seats) consisted of Charlotte, Cumberland and Gloucester counties.
The Western District (6 seats) consisted of Albany and Tryon counties.

Note: There are now 62 counties in the State of New York. The counties which are not mentioned in this list had not yet been established, or sufficiently organized, the area being included in one or more of the abovementioned counties. In 1784, Charlotte Co. was renamed Washington Co., and Tryon Co. was renamed Montgomery Co.

Senators
The asterisk (*) denotes members of the previous Legislature who continued in office as members of this Legislature. Ebenezer Russell and Jacob G. Klock changed from the Assembly to the Senate.

Employees
Clerk: Robert Benson

State Assembly

Districts

The City and County of Albany (10 seats)
Charlotte County (4 seats)
Cumberland County (3 seats)
Dutchess County (7 seats)
Gloucester County (2 seats)
Kings County (2 seats)
The City and County of New York (9 seats)
Orange County (4 seats)
Queens County (4 seats)
Richmond County (2 seats)
Suffolk County (5 seats)
Tryon County (6 seats)
Ulster County (6 seats)
Westchester County (6 seats)

Note: There are now 62 counties in the State of New York. The counties which are not mentioned in this list had not yet been established, or sufficiently organized, the area being included in one or more of the abovementioned counties. In 1784, Charlotte Co. was renamed Washington Co., and Tryon Co. was renamed Montgomery Co.

Assemblymen
The asterisk (*) denotes members of the previous Legislature who continued as members of this Legislature.

Employees
Clerk: John McKesson
Sergeant-at-Arms: Stephen Hendrickson
Doorkeeper: Richard Ten Eyck

Notes

Sources
The New York Civil List compiled by Franklin Benjamin Hough (Weed, Parsons and Co., 1858) [see pg. 108 for Senate districts; pg. 110 for senators; pg. 148f for Assembly districts; pg. 157f for assemblymen]

1778 in New York (state)
1779 in New York (state)
002